Thēthi, also known as Thēth, Thethiya, Thenthi, or Thati,  is a Maithili dialect, mainly spoken in the Mithila region of India and Nepal. It is spoken mainly in Kosi, Purnia and Munger divisions of Bihar, India and in some of the adjoining districts of Nepal. It has  speakers in India according to the 2011 census.

References

Languages of Bihar
Languages of India